The Way of the Phoenix is a 1998 role-playing game supplement for Legend of the Five Rings Roleplaying Game published by Alderac Entertainment Group.

Contents
The Way of the Phoenix is a supplement in which new spell rules are included for Phoenix Clan characters.

Reception
The Way of the Phoenix was reviewed in the online second version of Pyramid which said "There are Seven Major Clans in the world of Rokugan. The Way of the Phoenix is the last major clan to get  own individualized book. Each of the clans has something that stands out about them. For the Phoenix, that is spellcasting, mysticism and magic in general."

Reviews
Backstab #14

References

Legend of the Five Rings Roleplaying Game
Role-playing game books
Role-playing game supplements introduced in 1998